Terry Naylor (born 5 December 1948) is an English former professional footballer who played for Tottenham Hotspur and Charlton Athletic in the position of full back.

Career
Naylor joined Tottenham Hotspur in July 1969. He was previously employed as a meat porter at London's Smithfield Market. His tough, uncompromising style of play as a full back soon earned him the nickname of "Meathook" with the White Hart Lane faithful. He played a total of 243 games in all competitions for Spurs, including 14 as substitute. Naylor featured in both legs of the 1974 UEFA Cup Final against Feyenoord and was an unused substitute in both legs of the 1972 UEFA Cup Final against Wolverhampton Wanderers.

Naylor joined Charlton Athletic in November 1980 and went on to make 73 League appearances for the club.

Managerial 
1988–89, took charge of Tonbridge Angels for seven games.

Honours 
Tottenham Hotspur
 UEFA Cup winner: 1971–72
 UEFA Cup runner-up: 1973–74

Post–football career 
After his football career ended Naylor was employed as a postman for Royal Mail. Today, he is retired and still lives in the Islington area. In his spare time Naylor sings in pubs in and around Hackney and Islington.

References 

Footballers from Islington (district)
1948 births
Living people
Tottenham Hotspur F.C. players
Charlton Athletic F.C. players
English Football League players
English footballers
UEFA Cup winning players
Association football fullbacks